Clinker Peak is a peak on the shoulder of Mount Price in the Garibaldi Provincial Park in British Columbia, Canada. It is a stratovolcano in the Garibaldi Volcanic Belt, part of the Clinker Ridge on the west side of Garibaldi Lake. Clinker Peak is considered a volcanic vent of Mount Price, and produced two large lava flows approximately 9,000 years ago, that ponded against the retreating continental ice sheet and formed The Barrier, containing Garibaldi Lake.

Notes

External links

One-thousanders of British Columbia
Volcanoes of British Columbia
Stratovolcanoes of Canada
Subduction volcanoes
Holocene volcanoes
Garibaldi Lake volcanic field